Muhammad Humair Hayat Khan Niazi of Rokhri (born 20 October 1966) has been a member of the National Assembly of Pakistan. He defeated a federal minister, Sher Afghan Khan Niazi, in the 2008 elections for the NA-72 (Mianwali II) constituency. He previously served as District Nazim of Mianwali from 2001 to 2005. From 1991 to 1993, he was the chairman of the Zila Council of Mianwali. He was also elected as the youngest sitting chairman at 25.

Humair Hayat Khan comes from a well-known Niazi Pashtun tribe with a strong political background. He is the son of veteran politician Gul Hameed Khan Rokhri, the nephew of Provincial Assembly member Aamir Hayat Khan Rokhri, and the brother-in-law of Chaudhry Shafaat Hussain, a former District Nazim of Gujrat. He has four daughters and one son.

He attended St. Anthony's High School in Lahore and graduated from Government College University there in 1986. He earned his law degree with honours from the University of Reading in England in 1990. In 1991, he passed the Central Superior Services exam but chose to pursue a career in law and politics.

See also
 National Assembly of Pakistan

References

Humair
Rokhri,Humair Hayat Khan
Living people
Pashtun people
People from Mianwali District
Government College University, Lahore alumni
1966 births